Antony Bek (also spelled Beck or Beke; 127919 December 1343) was a medieval Bishop of Norwich.

Bek was elected Bishop of Lincoln on 3 February 1320 but the election was quashed later in the year.

Bek was the chancellor and dean of Lincoln Cathedral and was nominated to Bishop of Norwich by the Pope on 14 March 1337 and consecrated on 30 March 1337. Bek was a quarrelsome man and, after a stormy and tyrannical episcopate, died on 19 December 1343, possibly poisoned by his own servants at the instigation of the monks. He was replaced by Bishop Bateman.

Bek is not to be confused with Antony Bek, Bishop of Durham and Latin patriarch of Jerusalem, his kinsman and namesake.

Citations

References
 

1279 births
1343 deaths
Bishops of Norwich
14th-century English Roman Catholic bishops
Deans of Lincoln